Samudrala Venkata Ramanujacharyulu, better known as Samudrala Jr. (1923 – 31 May 1985) was an Indian screenwriter and lyricist known for his works in Telugu cinema. He is the son of screenwriter Samudrala Raghavacharya, better known as Samudrala Sr.

Filmography
 Bratuku Teruvu (1953 film) (lyricist)
 Thodu Dongalu (1954) (dialogue)
 Panduranga Mahatyam (1957)
 Sahasra Siracheda Apoorva Chinthamani (1960) (adaptation) (dialogue)
 Sabash Raja (1961) (dialogue) (story)
 Bhishma (1962)
 Gulebakavali Katha (1962) (adaptation) (dialogue)
 Paruvu Prathishta (1963) (dialogue)
 Pidugu Ramudu (1966)
 Bhama Vijayam (1967)
 Bala Bharatam (1972)
 Neramu Siksha (1973) (dialogues and lyrics)
 Shri Datta Darshanam (1985)

References

Telugu writers
1923 births
1985 deaths
20th-century Indian film directors
Telugu film directors
Telugu screenwriters
Indian male screenwriters
Film directors from Andhra Pradesh
Screenwriters from Andhra Pradesh
20th-century Indian dramatists and playwrights
20th-century Indian male writers
20th-century Indian screenwriters